Thomson Group Representation Constituency (GRC) was a defunct four-member constituency that compromises of Bishan East, Serangoon Gardens, Bishan North and Thomson from 1991 to 1997. It merged parts of Thomson and Serangoon Gardens itself. Thomson GRC was led by Leong Horn Kee and Wong Kan Seng.

History
The ward only exist for one term until 1997. Bishan and Thomson, along with Toa Payoh GRC, was merged to create Bishan–Toa Payoh GRC, while Serangoon Gardens was absorbed into three constituencies, namely Aljunied GRC, Ang Mo Kio GRC and Marine Parade GRC.

Members of Parliament

Candidates and results

Elections in the 1990s

References

Singaporean electoral divisions
Bishan, Singapore